Kalimantan is the Indonesian portion of the island of Borneo. It constitutes 73% of the island's area. The non-Indonesian parts of Borneo are Brunei and East Malaysia. In Indonesia, "Kalimantan" refers to the whole island of Borneo.

In 2019, President of Indonesia Joko Widodo proposed that Indonesia's capital be moved to Kalimantan, and in January 2022 Indonesian legislature approved the proposal. The shift is expected to take up to 10 years.

Etymology
The name Kalimantan is derived from the Sanskrit word Kalamanthana, which means "burning weather island", or island with a very hot temperature, referring to its hot and humid tropical climate. It consists of the two words kal[a] ("time, season, period") and manthan[a] ("boiling, churning, burning"). The indigenous people of the eastern region of Borneo referred to their island as Pulu K'lemantan or "Kalimantan" when the sixteenth century Portuguese explorer Jorge de Menezes made contact with them. Its association with the island and its people has also been attributed to British scientist and colonial administrator Charles Hose from the early 20th century.

Area

The Indonesian territory makes up 73% of the island by area, and 72.1% of its 2020 population of 23,053,723 (the population was 13,772,543 at the 2010 Census of Indonesia, and 16,625,796 at the 2020 Census). The non-Indonesian parts of Borneo are of Brunei (460,345 in 2020) and East Malaysia (5,967,582 in 2020), the latter comprising the states of Sabah (3,418,785) and Sarawak (2,453,677), and the federal territory of Labuan (95,120). The region within Indonesia is also known as Indonesian Borneo.

Administrative divisions

Kalimantan is now divided into five provinces. It was administered as one province between 1945 and 1956, but in 1956 it was split into three provinces - East Kalimantan, South Kalimantan and West Kalimantan; then in 1957, the province of Central Kalimantan was created when it was split away from the existing South Kalimantan. There remained four provinces until 25 October 2012, when North Kalimantan was split off from East Kalimantan.

* excluding North Kalimantan, split off from East Kalimantan with resulting population and area loss for the 2015 census.

Demographics

Ethnic groups
Number of the largest population of ethnic groups according to the 2010 census:

Religion

Number of the largest population of religious groups according to the 2010 census:

See also

 List of rivers of Kalimantan
 Languages of Kalimantan

References

External links
 
 

 
Borneo
Islands of Indonesia
Greater Sunda Islands
Maritime Southeast Asia
Populated places in Indonesia